The Grand Prince of Kiev (sometimes grand duke) was the title of the monarch of Kievan Rus', residing in Kiev (modern Kyiv) from the 10th to 13th centuries. In the 13th century, Kiev became an appanage principality first of the grand prince of Vladimir and the Mongol Golden Horde governors, and later was taken over by the Grand Duchy of Lithuania.

Rus' chronicles such as the Primary Chronicle are inconsistent in applying the title "grand prince" to various princes in Kievan Rus'. Although most sources consistently attribute it to the prince of Kiev, there is no agreement which princes were also "grand prince", and scholars have thus come up with different lists of grand princes of Kiev.

Background

Origins 
According to a founding myth in the Primary Chronicle, Kyi, Shchek and Khoryv and their sister Lybid co-founded the city of Kiev (Kyiv), and the oldest brother Kyi was "chief of his kin". Some western historians (i.e., Kevin Alan Brook) suppose that Kiev was founded by Khazars or Magyars. Kiev is a Turkic place name (Küi = riverbank + ev = settlement). At least during the 8th and 9th centuries Kiev functioned as an outpost of the Khazar empire (a hill-fortress, called Sambat, "high place" in Old Turkic). According to Omeljan Pritsak, Constantine Zuckerman and other scholars, Khazars lost Kiev at the beginning of the 10th century.

At some point, Rurik, a Varangian prince, allegedly founded the "Rurik dynasty" (named after him in the 16th century) in 862 through the "Invitation of the Varangians", but he is considered to be a legendary, mythical and perhaps even entirely fictional character by modern scholars. The Primary Chronicle never calls Rurik a prince of Kiev, but does suggest he was a prince of Novgorod with the phrase "...when Rurik was reigning at Novgorod." (the verb княжить knyazhitʹ means "to reign (as a prince [knyaz])").) 

Kiev was captured by Askold and Dir, whose existence is also debatable, and are called "boyars" who "did not belong to [Rurik's] family" by the Primary Chronicle. According to some Russian historians (i.e., Gleb S. Lebedev), Dir was a chacanus of Rhos (Rus khagan). Thomas Noonan asserts that one of the Rus "sea-kings", the "High king", adopted the title khagan in the early 9th century. Peter Benjamin Golden maintained that the Rus became a part of the Khazar federation, and that their ruler was officially accepted as a vassal khagan of the Khazar Khagan of Itil.

First princes 
Askold and Dir are narrated to have been killed in 882 by Oleg, the first "prince" (knyaz) of Kiev according to the Primary Chronicle, but not yet a "grand prince" (velikiy knyaz). His relation to Rurik is debatable, and has been rejected by several modern scholars. Although later Muscovite chroniclers would call Oleg a "grand prince" and Kiev a "grand principality", the earliest sources do not. Whereas the reconstructed original Greek text of the Rusʹ–Byzantine Treaty (907) calls Oleg a μεγας ἄρχων or "great archon" ("ruler"), the Old East Slavic translations found in the Laurentian Codex and Hypatian Codex do not. On the other hand, only when the Byzantine emperors Leo VI the Wise, Alexander and Constantine VII are called "the Great", Oleg is also called "the Great". Dimnik (2004) argued it should thus be read as "the Rus' prince Oleg the Great" instead of "Oleg the grand prince of Rus'". Similarly, the only occasions Igor of Kiev is ever called velikiy knyaz in the Primary Chronicle (six times) are all found in the Rusʹ–Byzantine Treaty (945), where the Greek emperors are also called k velikiy tsesarem Grech'-skim ("to the great Greek caesars"). The same happens when, after Sviatoslav's invasion of Bulgaria, the 971 peace treaty is recorded; it is the only place in the Primary Chronicle where Sviatoslav I is named a velikiy knyaz. Most significantly, the Nachal'nyy svod (found only in the Novgorod First Chronicle) never mentions any of these peace treaties, and never calls Oleg, Igor or Sviatoslav a velikiy knyaz. According to Dimnik (2004), this means that Greek scribes added the word "great" to the princely title, whereas the Rus' themselves did not, except when translating these three treaties from Greek into Slavic.

Yaropolk I of Kiev and Volodimer I of Kiev are both steadily referred to as just a knyaz by the Novgorod First Chronicle and the Laurentian and Hypatian Codices. There is one exception: the Hypatian Codex writes Volodimir knyaz velikii ("Volodimir the grand prince") when reporting the latter's death; because the Hypatian Codex is the latest source of the three (compiled  1425), this is probably a later interpolation. A Paterik of the Kyiv Pechersk Lavra of the early 13th century also calls Volodimer a velikiy knyaz, but that was written two centuries after his death, and may not necessarily describe how he was known while alive. The oldest surviving source available is Hilarion of Kiev's Sermon on Law and Grace ( 1040s), which calls Volodimer a kagan (a Khazar title) rather than a knyaz. Some scholars have suggested that this indicates Kievan Rus' had won its independence from the Khazars in the early 10th century, and had inherited the title of kagan from them, before exchanging it for knyaz later. The Church Statute of Prince Volodimir starts with "Behold, I, Prince Vasilii, called Volodimir,", but later in the text he interchangeably calls himself knyaz and velikiy knyaz, and the earliest copy of this document is from the 14th century, so it is difficult to say what the lost original text said. Since chroniclers also regularly referred to Volodimer as velikiy without mentioning his title – the reason why he has become known to history as Volodimer "the Great" – suggests that this adjective was not part of his title, but a sobriquet or nickname, that was also applied to other monarchs or clerics around him.

Sviatopolk I of Kiev was never called velikiy knyaz ("grand prince") in any source. Moreover, he has been stigmatised by chroniclers with the nickname "the Accursed" or "the Damned" (okayannyy) because of how he violently rose to power in the war of succession following Volodimir's death in 1015. On the other hand, Yaroslav the Wise is the first widely attested velikiy knyaz ("grand prince") in virtually all sources of the second half of the 11th century, and surviving copies of the Church Statute of Prince Yaroslav also strongly suggest he applied the title to himself while he was alive.

Princes of Kiev

Grand princes of Kiev

Princes of Kiev (Mongol invasion)
Due to the Mongol invasion of 1240, Michael of Chernigov left Kiev to seek military assistance from King Béla IV of Hungary. During that time, the prince of Smolensk, Rostislav, occupied Kiev, but was captured the same year by Daniel of Galicia who placed his voivode Dmytro to guard Kiev while the grand prince was away. Being unsuccessful in Hungary, Michael visited Konrad I of Masovia. Receiving no results in Poland, he eventually asked Daniel of Galicia for asylum due to the Mongol invasion. Since the 14th century, the principality of Kiev started to fall under the influence of Grand Duchy of Lithuania. In 1299, the Metropolitan of Kiev Maximus moved his metropolitan see from Kiev to Vladimir-on-Klyazma. In 1321, after the battle on the Irpin River, Gediminas installed Mindgaugas, one of his subjects from the house of Olshanski, a descendant of the family of Vseslav of Polotsk that was exiled to the Byzantine Empire. In 1331, Kiev was once again taken by a member of the Siverski house (Olgovichi branch), the prince of Putivl. After the Battle of Blue Waters in 1362, Kiev and its surrounding areas were incorporated into the Grand Duchy of Lithuania by Grand Duke Algirdas.

See also 

 Kiev Voivodeship
 List of Hungarian monarchs
 List of Polish monarchs
 List of rulers of Galicia and Volhynia
 List of rulers of Lithuania
 List of Russian monarchs
 List of Ukrainian rulers
 Symbols of the Rurikids

Notes

References

Bibliography 
  (primary source)

 
  (digital printing 2004)
 

 
Kiev, Grand Prince of
Noble titles of Kievan Rus
Kyiv-related lists